Mandra-Eidyllia is a municipality in the West Attica regional unit, Attica, Greece. The seat of the municipality is the town Mandra. The municipality has an area of 426.197 km2.

Municipality
The municipality Mandra–Eidyllia was formed at the 2011 local government reform by the merger of the following 4 former municipalities, that became municipal units:
Erythres
Mandra
Oinoi
Vilia

References

External links

Municipalities of Attica
Populated places in West Attica